Scaidava was a Dacian town between Iatrus and Trimammium (Ablanovo).

See also 
 Dacian davae
 List of ancient cities in Thrace and Dacia
 Dacia
 Roman Dacia

References

Ancient

Modern

Further reading 

 

Moesia
Dacian towns
Archaeological sites in Bulgaria
Ruins in Bulgaria
Ancient Bulgaria